Glynn Robert Donaho (March 25, 1905 – May 26, 1986), nicknamed "Donc", was a United States Navy officer known principally for his exploits as a submarine commander during World War II, for which he received the Navy Cross four times, the Silver Star twice, and the Bronze Star Medal.

Early life
Donaho was born in George, Texas. He entered United States Naval Academy on July 10, 1923 and graduated in 1927. He was commissioned Ensign, upon graduation.

Military career
Donaho's first assignment was aboard the battleship  from July 1927 to May 1930, followed by Submarine training at the Submarine Training School at Naval Submarine Base New London, Connecticut, from June to December 1930.

Donaho served as Navigator aboard the submarine  from December 1930 to March 1933, and then as Navigator aboard the submarine  from March 1933 to August 1934. His next assignment was as Navigator aboard the submarine . from August 1934 to June 1935, followed by Naval Postgraduate School at the United States Naval Academy from June 1935 to May 1937. Donaho served on the Staff of the Commander, Submarine Squadron 4 from June 1937 to May 1940, and then as Executive Officer aboard the submarine  from May 1940 to November 1941.

World War II

Donaho became Commanding Officer of the submarine  during her fitting out in November 1941. He led the submarine in five war patrols in the Pacific during World War II and sunk four vessels totaling 28,000 tons, and damaging two others totaling 12,620 tons. He was promoted to lieutenant commander at the beginning of 1942 and to commander in September of that year.

In 1944, Donaho commanded Submarine Division 222 as well as the submarine , during her third war patrol. He had contributed materially to the success of 18 war patrols, which resulted in the destruction of approximately 280,000 tons of enemy shipping and the damaging of an additional 80,000 tons. He again served with the Commander of Submarine Division 222 from October 1944 to May 1945, and then as Operations Officer with the Commander of Battleship Squadron 1 from May to October 1945.

Post war
Although he was called as a prosecution witness, Donaho's testimony was actually helpful to McVay. Both Donaho and Mochitsura Hashimoto, the commander of I-58, the Japanese submarine that sank the Indianapolis, testified that zigzagging would not have saved the Indianapolis.

Donaho was the Director of the Recruiting Division in the Bureau of Naval Personnel in Washington, D.C., from October 1945 to May 1948, followed by service as the Commander of Submarine Squadron 3 from May 1948 to June 1950. Donaho served as Assistant for United Nations Matters in the International Affairs Division in the Office of the Chief of Naval Operations from June to August 1950, followed by National War College from August 1950 to June 1951.

Donaho's next assignment was as Head of the Foreign Military Aid Branch with the International Affairs Division in the Office of the Chief of Naval Operations from June 1951 to July 1953, and then as Commander of Destroyer Squadron 17 from July 1953 to January 1955. He served as Chief of Staff and Aide to the Commander of United States Seventh Fleet from January to December 1955, followed by service as Commander of United States Naval Base Subic Bay in the Philippines from December 1955 to August 1957. Donaho was promoted to rear admiral in 1957.

Donaho served as the Commander of Destroyer Flotilla 3 from August 1957 to September 1958, and then as Director of the Logistics Plans Division in the Office of the Chief of Naval Operations from September 1958 to September 1959. His next assignment was as Director of Naval Administration from September 1959 to September 1962, followed by service as Naval Inspector General from September 1962 to July 1964, during this time he was promoted to vice admiral in 1963. His final assignment was as Commander of the Military Sea Transportation Service from July 1964 until his retirement from the Navy on April 1, 1967.

Later life
After his retirement from navy, Donaho lived in Washington D.C. and McLean, Virginia until 1978, before moving to Sierra Vista, Arizona.

Donaho died in Sierra Vista, Arizona, on May 26, 1986, due to pneumonia and heart ailment. In accordance to his wishes, he was cremated and his ashes were scattered over the Pacific Ocean from the fantail of a United States Navy submarine.

Awards and decorations

First Navy Cross citation
His official first Navy Cross citation reads:

Action Date: August 15 – September 15, 1942
Name: Glynn Robert Donaho
Service: Navy
Rank: Lieutenant Commander
Company: Commanding Officer
Division: U.S.S. Flying Fish (SS-229)
Citation: The President of the United States of America takes pleasure in presenting the Navy Cross to Lieutenant Commander Glynn Robert Donaho (NSN: 0-61092/1100), United States Navy, for extraordinary heroism and courageous devotion to duty in the line of his profession as Commanding Officer of the U.S.S. FLYING FISH (SS-229), on the SECOND War Patrol of that submarine during the period 15 August 1942 to 15 September 1942, in action with enemy Japanese naval forces in the Pacific War Area. Upon sighting a KONGO Class enemy battleship heavily screened by air and surface craft, Lieutenant Commander Donaho daringly maneuvered his ship to penetrate the enemy screen. In a bold, determined attack, he scored two direct hits, sinking an enemy patrol vessel and severely damaging the battleship which was observed to be burning fiercely one hour and fifty-three minutes later when the FLYING FISH returned to periscope depth after being driven deep by heavy enemy counter-offensive. The courage and skill displayed by Lieutenant Commander Donaho and the exemplary fighting spirit of his command were in keeping with the highest traditions of the United States Naval Service.

Second Navy Cross citation
His official second Navy Cross citation reads:

Action Date: October 27 – December 16, 1942
Name: Glynn Robert Donaho
Service: Navy
Rank: Lieutenant Commander
Company: Commanding Officer
Division: U.S.S. Flying Fish (SS-229)
Citation: The President of the United States of America takes pleasure in presenting a Gold Star in lieu of a Second Award of the Navy Cross to Lieutenant Commander Glynn Robert Donaho (NSN: 0-61092/1100), United States Navy, for extraordinary heroism in the line of his profession as Commanding Officer of the U.S.S. FLYING FISH (SS-229), on the THIRD War Patrol of that submarine during the period 27 October 1942 to 16 December 1942, in enemy controlled waters of the Solomon Islands. With skillful maneuvering and outstanding seamanship, Lieutenant Commander Donaho, despite the great mental and physical strain caused by long patrols in enemy waters, relentlessly pressed home his attacks. Defying the ever-present danger of anti-submarine measures, the men under his command on the FLYING FISH directed their torpedo fire with such accuracy that two enemy destroyers were sunk, while their own ship came through unscathed. Lieutenant Commander Donaho's courageous devotion to duty and intrepid fighting spirit reflect great credit upon himself, his command, and the United States Naval Service.

Third Navy Cross citation
His official third Navy Cross citation reads:

General Orders: Commander in Chief Pacific: Serial 01227
Action Date: January 5 – February 28, 1943
Name: Glynn Robert Donaho
Service: Navy
Rank: Lieutenant Commander
Company: Commanding Officer
Division: U.S.S. Flying Fish (SS-229)
Citation: The President of the United States of America takes pleasure in presenting a Second Gold Star in lieu of a Third Award of the Navy Cross to Lieutenant Commander Glynn Robert Donaho (NSN: 0-61092/1100), United States Navy, for extraordinary heroism and distinguished service in the line of his profession as Commanding Officer of the U.S.S. FLYING FISH (SS-229), on its FOURTH War Patrol in the Pacific, patrolling the waters of the Marianas Islands from 5 January 1943 to 28 February 1943. Skillfully maneuvering his ship within striking distance of the enemy, Commander Donaho made repeated torpedo attacks against Japanese shipping, sinking four vessels totaling 28,000 tons, and damaging two others totaling 12,620 tons. Despite vicious and determined countermeasures, he and his gallant men brought the FLYING FISH through these actions with only minor damage and without personnel casualties. Commander Donaho's able and fearless leadership and aggressive fighting spirit were in keeping with the highest traditions of the United States Naval Service.

Fourth Navy Cross citation
His official fourth Navy Cross citation reads:

General Orders: Pacific Fleet Board Awards: Serial 80 (January 5, 1945)
Action Date: July 23 – October 3, 1944
Name: Glynn Robert Donaho
Service: Navy
Rank: Captain
Company: Commanding Officer
Division: U.S.S. Picuda (SS-382)
Citation: The President of the United States of America takes pleasure in presenting a Third Gold Star in lieu of a Fourth Award of the Navy Cross to Captain [then Commander] Glynn Robert Donaho (NSN: 0-61092/1100), United States Navy, for extraordinary heroism in the line of his profession as Commanding Officer of the U.S.S. PICUDA (SS-382), on the THIRD War Patrol of that submarine during the period 23 July 1944 to 3 October 1944, and as Commander of the ELEVENTH Coordinated Attack Group of Submarines. Despite strong air and surface escort screens maintained around enemy shipping, Captain Donaho launched well planned and aggressive torpedo attacks which resulted in the sinking of five enemy freighters totaling 20,000 tons, and in the infliction of severe damage on a large 10,000-ton Japanese transport. In addition, he planned the actions of the attack group which sank sixteen enemy ships totaling 93,500 tons and damaged six other enemy ships totaling 49,000 tons and, escaping severe enemy countermeasures, brought his ship back to port. His professional skill and devotion to duty were in keeping with the highest traditions of the United States Naval Service.

References

Silent victory: the U.S. submarine war against Japan, Clay Blair Jr. (Imprint Annapolis, Md.: Naval Institute Press, 2001)
Abandon Ship! The Saga of the U.S.S. Indianapolis, the Navy's Greatest Sea Disaster, Richard F. Newcomb (Harper Collins, 2001)

External links
Glynn R. Donaho U.S. Naval Historical Center, provides photos and biographical information on Vice Admiral Donaho.
Information regarding Donaho's testimony at Captain McVay's court martial.
Additional information regarding Donaho's testimony at Captain McVay's court martial. 

1905 births
1986 deaths
United States Navy personnel of World War II
Recipients of the Navy Cross (United States)
Recipients of the Navy Distinguished Service Medal
Recipients of the Silver Star
People from Madison County, Texas
United States Naval Academy alumni
United States Navy vice admirals
United States submarine commanders
United States Navy Inspectors General
People from Sierra Vista, Arizona
Military personnel from Texas
Burials at sea